HMS Armada was the name of two ships of the British Royal Navy:

  was a 74-gun third rate launched in 1810 that saw action in the War of 1812 and was sold in 1863.
  was a  launched in 1943 and scrapped in 1965.

Royal Navy ship names